Washington Township is one of the fourteen townships of Carroll County, Ohio, United States. As of the 2020 census, the population was 1,116.

Geography
Located in the east central part of the county, it borders the following townships:
Augusta Township - north
East Township - northeast
Fox Township - east
Lee Township - south
Center Township - southwest
Harrison Township - west
Brown Township - northwest corner

No municipalities are located in Washington Township.

Name and history
It is one of forty-three Washington Townships statewide.  Originally Township 14 of range 5 of the Old Seven Ranges, and later a part of Columbiana County, the township was admitted whole with the formation of Carroll county.  In March, 1836, the county commissioners took part of Washington township along with a part of Harrison Township to form Centre (later Center) township.

Government

The township is governed by a three-member board of trustees, who are elected in November of odd-numbered years to a four-year term beginning on the following January 1. Two are elected in the year after the presidential election and one is elected in the year before it. There is also an elected township fiscal officer, who serves a four-year term beginning on April 1 of the year after the election, which is held in November of the year before the presidential election. Vacancies in the fiscal officership or on the board of trustees are filled by the remaining trustees.

Education
Students attend the Carrollton Exempted Village School District.

References

External links
County website

Townships in Carroll County, Ohio
Townships in Ohio